Hundred to One is a team-based game show on Russian television, analogous to the American game Family Feud.  It premiered on January 8, 1995 on NTV, subsequently moved to MTK, then to the channel TV Center. From October 1998 to the present time the program goes on air weekly on Sundays at 12:20 Moscow time on TV channel Russia. The general timing (including Advertising blocks) is 55 minutes. Earlier editions, from 2000–2008 years were transmitted daily on the channel "Questions and answers". From 1995 to 2022, its host was Alexander Gurevich. After he left the channel in the light of Russia's invasion of Ukraine, he was replaced by Alexander Akopov in October 2022.

Absolute record in the main part of the game
 December 23, 2018 team "Si Major" set a new record of 730 points, in the Big game has scored 216 points.

Other notable records
 Arguably the most internationally well-known incident from the show was a contestant in the Big Game, Vardan Markos, who failed to answer a single question, using his entire 20 second time limit trying to think of an answer to his first question - "What does a musician value the most?". Gurevich, while laughing, then asked him what he would have answered for this and the other four questions, and Markos claimed that he would have said "instrument", ironically the top answer, for the first question.

References

External links
 Official Russia (TV channel) site (Russian)

Russia-1 original programming
NTV (Russia) original programming
Family Feud
Russian game shows
1995 Russian television series debuts
1990s Russian television series
Russian television series based on American television series